José María Medina (13 February 1921 – 16 October 2005) was a Uruguayan footballer. He played in five matches for the Uruguay national football team from 1941 to 1946. He was also part of Uruguay's squad for the 1941 South American Championship.

References

External links
 

1921 births
2005 deaths
Uruguayan footballers
Uruguay international footballers
Place of birth missing
Association football forwards